The 2017 Sunshine Ladies Tour was the 4th season of the Sunshine Ladies Tour, a series of professional golf tournaments for women based in  South Africa.

Schedule
The season consisted of 11 events, ten in South Africa and one in Eswatini, played between January and May.

Order of Merit
This shows the leaders in the final Order of Merit.

Source:

References

External links
Official homepage of the Sunshine Ladies Tour

Sunshine Ladies Tour
Sunshine Ladies Tour